Diamond open access refers to academic texts (such as monographs, edited collections, and journal articles) published/distributed/preserved with no fees to either reader or author. Alternative labels include platinum open access, non-commercial open access, cooperative open access or, more recently, open access commons. While these terms were first coined in the 2000s and the 2010s, they have been retroactively applied to a variety of structures and forms of publishing, from subsidized university publishers to volunteer-run cooperatives that existed in prior decades.

In 2021, it is estimated that between 17,000 and 29,000 scientific journals rely on a diamond open access model. They make up 73% of the journals registered in the Directory of Open Access Journals and 44% of the articles, as their mean output is smaller than commercial journals. The diamond model has been especially successful in Latin America-based journals (95% of OA journals) following the emergence of large publicly supported platforms, such as SciELO and Redalyc.

In 2022, new national and international policies, such as the UNESCO recommendation on open science, and the Action Plan for Diamond Open Access promoted by the cOAlition S aim to support the development of non-commercial or community-driven forms open access publishing.

Context and definition

Historical roots of diamond models: knowledge clubs and commons

Until the Second World War, academic publishing was mostly characterized by a wide range of community-driven scholarly structures with little concern for profitability. Most journals of the 19th century and the first part of the 20th century were collective initiatives led by a scientific movement or institution that largely relied on informal community norms rather than commercial regulations. These historical practices have been described as a form of knowledge commons, or, more specifically, as a knowledge club that holds an intermediary status between a knowledge commons and a private company: while managed by a community, journals are mostly used to the benefit of a selected set of authors and readers.

In Western Europe and North America, direct ownership of journals by academic communities and institutions started to wane in the 1950s. The expansion of scientific publishing in the context of big science led to a perceived "crisis" of the historical model of scientific periodicals. Between 1950 and 1980, the new model of large commercial publishers came to dominate numerous fields of scientific publishing in western countries:

This transformation had wide-ranging consequences over the way scientific journals were managed, not only at the economic but also at the editorial level with an increased standardization of publishing norms, peer-review process, or copyrights. Yet it was neither global nor general, and communal forms of journal ownership and management remained significant in large geographic areas (like Latin America) and in several disciplines, especially in the humanities and the social sciences.

Development of "grassroots" open access (1990–2010)
The open access movement emerged both as a consequence of the unprecedented access afforded by online publishing and as a reaction against the large corporate model that has come to dominate scientific publishing since the Second World War and the hyper-inflation of subscription prices. The early pioneers of open access electronic publishing were non-commercial and community-driven initiatives that built up on a trend of grassroot publishing innovation in the social sciences and the humanities:

Specialized free software for scientific publishing like Open Journal Systems became available after 2000. This development entailed a significant expansion of non-commercial open access journals by facilitating the creation and the administration of journal websites and the digital conversion of existing journals. Among the journals registered in the Directory of Open Access Journals (DOAJ) without an article processing charge (APC), the number of annual creation has gone from 100 by the end of the 1990s to 800 around 2010, and has not evolved significantly since then.

Debates over the identity of the open access commons (2003–2012)
In the early debates over open access, the distinctions between commercial and non-commercial forms of scientific publishing and community-driven or corporate-owned structures seldom appear, possibly due to the lack of viable business model for open access. Open access publications were rather increasingly categorized into two different editorial forms: open access articles made immediately available by the publisher and pre-published articles hosted on an online archive (either as a pre-print or post-print). Starting in 2003, the ROMEO project started to devise a color-code system to better identify the policy of scientific publishers in regard to open sharing of scientific articles, from "yellow" (pre-print only) to "green" (no restriction in place): "the 'greenest' publishers are those that allow self-archiving not only of the author's accepted manuscript, but of the fully formatted and paginated publisher PDF". In 2004, Harnad et al. repurposed this classification scheme into a highly influential binary scale: articles directly made available by the publisher belong to "gold" open access (instead of "yellow") and online archives are defined as "green" open access. With this breakdown of open access into "green" and "gold", there is no distinction between commercial and non-commercial publishers. For Peter Suber the "gold" model embraces both journals supported by APCs or by other means of funding, as well as volunteer-run journals: "In the jargon, OA delivered by journals is called gold OA, and OA delivered by repositories is called green OA."

Tom Wilson introduced the expression "Platinum Open Access" in 2007 following an heated debate with Stevan Harnad and other open access activists on the American Scientist Open Access Forum mailing list. On his blog, Wilson defended the necessity of enlarging the classification of open access publishing forms as well as stressed the danger of conflating commercial and non-commercial open access journals.

The term "diamond open access" was coined later in 2012 by Marie Farge, a French mathematician and physicist and open access activist. Farge was involved in the Cost of Knowledge campaign led by Timothy Gowers against the excessive cost of scientific publishing. The reference to "diamond" was a hyperbolic pun on the "gold" metaphor that aims to suggest that non-commercial/free model were ultimately the best: "I have proposed to call this third way 'Diamond OA' by outbidding the 'Gold OA' terminology chosen by the publishers". "Free OA" was also contemplated as an alternative name.

The Forum of Mathematics, an open access journals co-created by Timothy Gowers, was the first publication to explicitly claim to be a diamond journal: "For the first three years of the journal, Cambridge University Press will waive the publication charges. So for three years the journal will be what Marie Farge (who has worked very hard for a more rational publication system) likes to call diamond open access, a quasi-miraculous model where neither author nor reader pays anything".

Defining the diamond model (2012–…)

In 2013, Fuchs and Sandoval published one of the first systematic definition of diamond open access: "Diamond open access Model, not-for-profit, non-commercial organizations, associations or networks publish material that is made available online in digital format, is free of charge for readers and authors and does not allow commercial and for-profit re-use." This definition is associated to a controversial stance against the leading definition of gold open access: "We argue for differentiating the concept of Gold Open Access Publishing because Suber and others mesh together qualitatively different models, i.e. for-profit and not-for-profit ones, into the same category, whereas others, especially policy makers, simply forget or exclude not-for-profit models that do not use author fees or reader fees." The debate over the relationship between "diamond" or "platinum" open access publications with "Gold" open access has never settled and remains a point of contention in 2021, even after the publication of the OA Diamond Study. While valuing the study, Martin Paul Eve still consider diamond open access as a "category error".

Since 2013, the theoretical literature on the diamond model has been increasingly influenced by the institutional analysis of the commons. Consequently, the "Open access commons" has recently emerged has an alternative label, although it is less used in a descriptive way and more as a programmatic ideal for the future of non-commercial open access. The conclusion of the OA Diamond study calls for the realization of The OA Commons as "a diverse, thriving, innovative and more interconnected and collaborative OA diamond journal ecosystem that supports bibliodiversity and serves many languages, cultures and domains in the future.". Similarly, Janneke Adema and Samuel Moore have  proposed to "redefine the future of scholarly publishing in communal settings" through a "scaling small" that ensure the preservation and development of diverse editorial models.

Analysis of the diamond model has been significantly deepened by the commission of large scale empirical studies such as the OA Cooperative Study (2016) by the Public Knowledge Project or the OA Diamond Study (2021) by the cOAlition S. Noteworthy, the 2021 study found:

 the number of Diamond OA journals is very large (>29,000), but only ca. a third of them registered in DOAJ, and only ca. 5% are indexed in either Scopus or Web of Science. Over half of these Diamond OA journals publish 25 articles per year or fewer.
 Between 2017 and 2019 paid-access journals published ca. 80% of all articles, paid-OA journals published ca. 11% and Diamond OA published ca. 9%.
 The share of Diamond OA publications among all OA journal articles peaked in 2018 and has been declining since.
 Only 4.3% of Diamond OA journals are fully compliant with all Plan S criteria.
 Only 55% of Diamond OA journals provide DOI numbers for their articles.
 Only 25% of the Diamond OA journals provide their content as XML or HTML (in addition to pdf).
 Only ca. half of the Diamond OA journals provide download statistics for their content.
 2/3 of the Diamond OA journals use double-blind peer review, which is higher than for subscription journals, that prefer single-blind peer review.
 25% of the Diamond OA journals operated at a loss, and just over 40% reported breaking even. The rest did not know their financial status.
 Although all Diamond OA journals rely heavily on volunteer work, they have some revenue sources, such as grants, collectively-organised funding, donations, shared infrastructure, membership fees, freemium services, Subscribe to Open, etc.
 70% of Diamond OA journals declared their operating cost less than $/€10,000 per year. Au contraire, before its cancellation of Elsevier's subscription in 2012, Harvard alone paid 40 k$/year for just one (the most expensive) Elsevier's journal.
 The most challenging area for OA diamond journals is indexation and content visibility in the main research databases, such as Scopus, Web of Science and SciFinder.

Distribution of diamond open access journals

The OA Diamond Study gives an estimation of >29,000 diamond open access journals in 2021 which represent a significant share of the total number of scholarly journals. Diamond journals make up for 73% of the open access journals registered on the Directory of Open Access Journals with 10,194 entries out of 14,020 in September 2020. In 2013, Fuchs and Sandoval already noted that, as a far as the number of individual journals is concerned, Diamond open access is the main form of open access publishing: "Diamond open access is not just an idea, but rather, as the empirical data provided in this paper shows, the dominant reality of open access."

While the diamond model is prevalent among open access journals when looking at the journal titles, this is not the case when looking at the aggregated number of articles, as they publish less articles overall. The OA Diamond Study finds that the 10,194 journals without publication fees registered on the Directory of Open Access Journals published 356,000 articles per year on the 2017-2019 instead of 453,000 articles published by 3,919 commercial journals with APC: "we see that OA Diamond publishes around 8-9% of the total number of scholarly articles, and APC-based OA journals around 10-11%." This discrepancy can be mostly attributed to a consistently lower output of diamond open access journal in comparison with commercial journals: "In DOAJ we find that the majority of OA diamond journals (54.4%) publish 24 or fewer articles per year; only 33.4% of APC-based journals have a similar size." Diamond journals also have a more diverse editorial production which includes other forms of scholarly productions like book reviews or editorials which may contribute to decrease their share in the total number of research articles.

On the 2014–2019, the output of diamond open access journal has continued to grow in absolute terms, but has decreased relatively to the output of commercial open access journals. The period showed a significant development of APC-based large publisher as well as an increasing conversion of legacy subscription-based publishers to the commercial open access model.

Any estimation of the number of diamond journals or articles is challenging as most non-commercial or community-run journals do not identify as diamond journals and this definition has to be deduced reconstructed from the lack of APC of any other commercial activity. Additionally, diamond Journals more frequently struggle to perform the registration on academic indexes and remain largely uncharted.

Geographic distribution

The majority of diamond open access journals are in Latin America and Europe: "about 45% are published in Europe and 25% in Latin America". In relative terms, the diamond model is especially prevalent in Latin America, with 95% of Open Access journals registered in DOAJ, and in Eastern Europe (81%). In contrast with Western European and North American countries, the open access movement in Latin America was largely structured around publicly supported platforms like Redalyc, or Scielo rather than APC-based publishers:

The OA Diamond Study accounts these separated developments to the presence or the lack of large privately owned publishers: "Most major, large
commercial publishers are based in Western Europe or US/Canada, which explains some of the relative dominance of the APC-model in these regions. Without these publishers, Western Europe and US/Canada would be more similar to other regions." Latin American journals have long been neglected in the main commercial indexes, which may have encouraged the development of local initiatives.

The diamond model has come to embody an ideal of social justice and cultural diversity in emerging and developing countries. Diamond open access journals are more likely to be multilingual (38%): "while English is the most common language, it is more important for APC-based journals than for OA diamond ones. Spanish, Portuguese and French play a much more important role for OA diamond journals than for APC-based ones. Generally, this holds for most languages other than English."

Disciplines
While diamond OA journals are available for most disciplines, they are more prevalent in the humanities and social science. The OA Diamond Study finds that, among the journals registered on the DOAJ, humanities and social science publications make up 60% of Diamond open access journals and only 23.9% of APC-based journals. This distribution may be due to the differentiated evolution of scientific publishing during the 20th century: "small HSS journals are often owned by universities and societies who often prefer OA diamond models, while many big science and medicine journals are owned by commercial publishers, more inclined to use APC models."

The diamond model remain attested in various disciplines, with 22.2% of diamond journals in STEM and 17.1% in Medicine. Medical diamond journals are often embedded in local communities, especially in non-western countries: "It becomes apparent that local diamond OA journals are not only important in HSS, but also in medicine."

An additional survey led by the OA Diamond Survey on 1,619 diamond OA journals highlights a more complex disciplinary distribution: although the social sciences (27.2%) and the humanities (19.2%) are well represented, more than a quarter of the respondents did not favor one discipline in particular (15.1% for multidisciplinary and 12% for "other").

Organization and economics
Most diamond open access journals are managed by academic institutions, communities or platforms: "The majority of journals (42%) are owned by universities. The main alternatives are learned societies (14%) and, to a lesser extent, government agencies, university presses and individuals." This integration ensure the autonomy of the journals: they "are inherently independent from commercial publishers as they are not created by them and do not rely on them at the management level." The OA Diamond Study introduced a taxonomy of 6 types of diamond OA journals that is strongly associated to their ownership status: institutional journal, learned-society journal, volunteer-run journal, publisher journal, platform journal and large journal.

The main sources of support for diamond OA journals are non-monetary: in-kind support from research institutions (such as hosting and software maintenance or copy-editing services) and voluntary contributions. Grant funding is significantly less mentioned, possibly as it does not always ensure a regular source of support. Since the 1990s, shared platforms have become important intermediary actors for diamond journals, especially in Latin America (Redalyc, AmeliCA, ScIELO, Ariadna Ediciones) and some European countries like France (OpenEdition Journals, via Lodel), or the Netherlands, Finland, Croatia, and Denmark (all via PKP's Open Journal System). As the core definition of the diamond model is focused on the lack of APC charges, a few diamond journals (less than 5-10% of the respondents of the OA Diamond Survey) maintain a commercial activities by charging for services or additional features (freemium).

Running costs of diamond journals are low: half of the 1,600 journals surveyed by the OA Diamond Study "reported costs lower than 1000$/€" per year. The median cost per articles is around $200, which is significantly lower than the standard prices of Article Processing charges in commercial open access journals. Theses low costs can be accounted by institutional support, limited expenses and reliance on volunteer work: 60% of the journals surveyed in the OA Diamond Study were at least partly run by volunteers. The governance model has a direct impact on the economic model of Diamond open access journals. Journals embedded in an academic institution are more like to benefit from direct fundings or support whereas "journals owned by learned societies rely significantly more on membership fees".

Issues and perspectives

Apparent limitations of focus 
Although the introductory definition points to diamond open access as referring to "texts (such as books and scientific journal articles) published/distributed/preserved with no fees to both readers and authors", a conceptual narrowing of focus in recent discussions can be perceived that practically limits the definition's scope to mostly refer to journals. 

While this narrowing of conceptual focus might be due to pragmatic reasons, as a concept, it needs to be kept in mind that diamond open access is a format-agnostic concept that can include all research outputs, from journals to the long form (book chapters, monographs) that plays an important role in the Humanities and Social Sciences.

Preservation

Long-term preservation is essential for all scholarly publications and under observation for diamond open access journals. Results from a survey presented in the OA Diamond Journals Study indicate that 57% of the journals "state that, to the best of their knowledge, they have no preservation policy in place". The lack of preservation mechanism for non-APC OA journals has been framed as a "tragedy of the commons". While the libraries have an incentive to preserve articles published by subscription-based journals to make sure the investment has not been lost, there is no similar motivation for free online content: "Efforts around preservation and continued access are often aimed at securing postcancellation access to subscription journals."

Efforts are underway to solve this issue, such as Project JASPER which is a project underway between the Directory of Open Access Journals, CLOCKSS, the Internet Archive, the KEEPERS Registry, and PKP-PN, as well as the automated preservation of published articles in LOCKSS when Open Journal Systems (OJS) is used. 60% of the diamond open access surveyed in the OA Diamond Journals Study use this popular choice open source software application for managing and publishing their diamond open access journals. Open Journal System 60% of the diamond open access surveyed in the OA Diamond Journals Study use this software for managing and publishing their diamond open access journals.

Recognition
While they make up for a large share of open access publications, diamond open access journals have long been overlooked by scientific policies and funding mechanisms:

The launch of the cOAlition-S initiative in 2018 made the recognition issue of Diamond journals more pressing. Support to open access publishing would now be conditioned on the adherence of a series of editorial and economic standards which Diamond journals may struggle to conform to, given their limited means. The OA Diamond Study was commissioned in 2020 by the cOAlition-S. In its final recommendation, the study calls to fully integrate Diamond journals into the plan-S strategy:

In 2020 and 2021, the institutional recognition of the diamond model has significantly progressed with unprecedented commitments from national and international organization. The 2021 UNESCO recommendation for Open Science calls for "supporting not-for-profit, académie and scientific community-driven publishing models as a common good". The second French Plan for Open Science encouraged a "diversification of economic models" that especially highlight the diamond model as it should enable "a transition from subscription towards open access with no publishing fees". In March 2022, an Action Plan for Diamond Open Access has been published with the support of the cOAlition S, Science Europe, OPERAS and the French National Research Agency. It aims to "expand a sustainable, community-driven Diamond scholarly communication ecosystem."

References

Bibliography

OA Diamond Study & Action Plan

Book & thesis

Articles & chapters

Conference

Other web sources

Academic publishing
Social movements
Electronic publishing
Scholarly communication
Free culture movement